Petrovka, 38 is a 1980 Soviet crime film directed by Boris Grigoryev.

Plot 
The film tells about the employees of the Moscow Criminal Investigation who are investigating the robberies committed by a group of criminals with dark glasses.

Cast 
 Georgi Yumatov as Aleksey Pavlovich Sadchikov
 Vasily Lanovoy as Vyacheslav Nikolayevich Kostenko
 Yevgeni Gerasimov as Valya Poslyakov
 Lyudmila Nilskaya as Alyena
 Mikhail Zhigalov
 Aleksandr Nikiforov as Chita
 Nikolai Eryomenko
 Grigoriy Lyampe
 Aleksandr Egorov as Lyonka Samsonov (as Sasha Yegorov)
 Yuri Volkov as Aleksey Alekseyevich Samsonov

References

External links 
 

Fictional portrayals of the Moscow City Police
1980 films
1980s Russian-language films
Soviet crime films
1980s crime films